No. 289 Squadron RAF was a Royal Air Force squadron formed as an anti-aircraft cooperation unit in World War II.

History

Formation in World War II
The squadron formed at  RAF Kirknewton on 17 November 1941 and was equipped with  Lysanders and Blenheims,  Hurricanes and Hudsons  to provide practice for the anti-aircraft defences in Scotland by towing targets and conducting simulated attacks. The squadron moved to RAF Turnhouse and RAF West Freugh, then operated other aircraft types from bases in England before it was disbanded at RAF Andover on 26 June 1945.

Aircraft operated

References

External links

 History of No.'s 286–290 Squadrons at RAF Web
 289 Squadron history on the official RAF website

289
Military units and formations established in 1941